Bernard Devlin (1923–1983) was a Canadian film director, producer and writer who played an important role in the development of the National Film Board of Canada (NFB).

Biography
Devlin was born and raised in Quebec City. After attending Loyola College, he joined the Royal Canadian Navy and saw action in the Atlantic, the Mediterranean and North Africa. After the war, he moved to Ottawa and joined the NFB in 1946, becoming one of the few French-Canadians there. He joined Vincent Paquette and Jean Palardy; after the war, the NFB hired Roger Blais and Raymond Garceau, among others. This group made French films, but it also continued to make English films, and dub them for Quebec. In 1951, the NFB created a studio for the creation of French-language films. Devlin wasn't given a title, but he was put in charge of the unit and spent the next two years producing films about French-Canadian culture. While he was reportedly an anti-nationalist, he did a great deal to further French-Canadian film production at the NFB.

In 1953, the NFB produced its first television series, which ran for two years on the CBC. It was called On the Spot and it was a series of short documentaries, 39 of which were directed and/or produced by Devlin. 

In 1954, he was seconded by Radio-Canada to help establish French-language television programming and spent the next five years creating Sur le vif (On the Spot). These were NFB-produced films for the CBC; the difference was that there were no dubbed versions of English films and no duplications of subject matter. They were original films, in French, for French-Canadians.

Devlin returned to the National Film Board in 1959, directing French-language television programs, and was director of French production again from 1960 to 1961. In 1971, he was given the one-year appointment of Director of English Production. He spent the latter years of his career creating English-language films and retired in 1977. He died in Montreal in 1983, at age 59.

Filmography
Ski Skill - documentary short, 1946 - co-writer with Sydney Newman, co-director with Roger Blais 
Vive le ski! - documentary short, 1946 - co-writer with Roger Blais and Georges Ayotte, co-director with Roger Blais
Ici...Ottawa - documentary short, 1946 - writer, director
Vers l'avenir - documentary short, 1947 - director
Horizons de Québec - documentary short, 1948 - writer, director 
Double Heritage - documentary short, 1948 - director 
Abitibi - documentary short, David Bairstow 1949 - writer 
A Capital Plan - documentary short, 1949 - director
French Canada: 1534-1848 - documentary short, 1950 - director 
Local 100 - short film, 1950 - writer, director
St. Lawrence Coaster - documentary short, Denys Gagnon 1951 - editor
Ottawa: Today and Tomorrow - documentary short, 1951 - director 
The Sexton - documentary short, Raymond Garceau 1952 - producer 
Seven Islands - documentary short, Gil LaRoche 1952 - producer 
The Puppeteers - documentary short, Jacques Giraldeau 1952 - producer
The Bird Fancier - short film, 1952 - co-director with Jean Palardy 
The Settler - documentary short, 1952 - writer, co-director with Raymond Garceau
Winter Week-end - short film, 1952 - director
Backstage - documentary short, 1953 - producer 
Tempest in Town - short film, Raymond Garceau 1953 - producer 
The Motorman - documentary short, Gil LaRoche 1953 - producer 
Music Professor - documentary short, Gil LaRoche 1953 - producer 
The Village Notary - short film, Pierre Arbour 1953 - producer 
The Wind-Swept Isles - documentary short, Jean Palardy 1953 - producer 
Ti-Jean Goes Lumbering - short film, Jean Palardy 1953 - executive producer 
On the Spot: School for Charm - documentary short, 1953 - writer, director
On the Spot: Transpacific Flight - documentary short, 1953 - producer 
On the Spot: Football Story - documentary short, 1953 - producer, director
On the Spot: Hotel Story - documentary short, 1953 - producer, director
On the Spot: Winnipeg Ballet - documentary short, 1953 - producer
On the Spot: The Winnipeg Story - documentary short, 1953 - producer
On the Spot: Oil - documentary short, 1953 - producer, director 
On the Spot: Saskatchewan Farm Museum Story - documentary short, 1953 - producer, director 
On the Spot: It's Raining Soldiers! - documentary short, 1953 - producer, director 
On the Spot: The Mounties' Crime Lab - documentary short, 1953 - editor, producer, director
On the Spot: The Zoo in Stanley Park- documentary short, 1953 - producer, director 
On the Spot: Aviation Medicine- documentary short, 1954 - producer 
On the Spot: The Strong Man- documentary short, Julian Biggs 1954 - producer 
On the Spot: Story of a Newspaper- documentary short, Julian Biggs 1954 - producer 
On the Spot: The Doll Factory - documentary short, Julian Biggs 1954 - producer 
On the Spot: Better Business Bureau - documentary short, 1954 - producer, director
On the Spot: Bureau of Missing Persons - documentary short, 1954 -director
On the Spot: Chosen Children - documentary short, 1954 -producer, director 
On the Spot: Curtain Time in Ottawa - documentary short, 1954 - producer, director 
On the Spot: French Cuisine - documentary short, 1954 -producer, director
On the Spot: Harness Racing - documentary short, 1954 - producer, director
On the Spot: Javanese Dancing - documentary short, 1954 - director
On the Spot: Judo - Jinks - documentary short, 1954 - editor, producer, director 
On the Spot: Korea, After the War - documentary short, 1954 - producer, director 
On the Spot: Movies in the Mill - documentary short, Allen Stark 1954 - producer
On the Spot: Cancer Clinic - documentary short, Allen Stark 1954 - producer
On the Spot: The Magic Men - documentary short, Jack Olsen 1954 - producer
On the Spot: End of Tour - documentary short, 1954 - producer
On the Spot: Camera Men - documentary short, Allen Stark 1954 - producer
On the Spot: Police Club for Boys - documentary short, Allen Stark 1954 - producer
On the Spot: Test Pilot - documentary short, Allen Stark 1954 - producer
On the Spot: Deep Sleep - documentary short, Jack Olsen 1954 - producer
On the Spot: The Traffic Cop - documentary short, Jack Olsen 1954 - producer
On the Spot: Micro Movies - documentary short, 1954 - producer, director
On the Spot: On Leave in Tokyo - documentary short, 1954 - producer, director 
On the Spot: Survival in the Bush - documentary short, 1954 - director 
On the Spot: The Car Mart - documentary short, Walford Hewitson 1954 - producer
On the Spot: Laurentian Skiing - documentary short, Allen Stark 1954 - producer
On the Spot: Vancouver's Chinatown - documentary short, 1954 - producer, director 
Men at Work - short film, Donald Peters, 1954 - producer 
Window on Canada No. 26 - documentary short, 1954 - producer 
Saint-Jean - documentary short, Gil LaRoche 1954 - producer 
L'abbé Pierre - documentary short, 1954 - director, co-producer with Robert Anderson
L'or de l'Abitibi - documentary short, 1954 - producer, director
Le prospecteur - documentary short, 1954 - producer, director
Les Polonais du Canada - documentary short, 1954 - director, co-producer with Robert Anderson
La Coupe du bois en Colombie-Britannique - short film, Gil LaRoche 1954 - producer 
Dorval et Gander - short film, Gil LaRoche 1954 - producer 
La Fabrication du papier - short film, Gil LaRoche 1954 - producer
Regards sur le Canada Numbers 1-12 - documentary shorts, 1954 - producer, co-director with Robert Anderson
Reliques indiennes - documentary short, Gil LaRoche 1954 - producer 
Saint-Pierre-et-Miquelon - short film, Gil LaRoche 1954 - producer 
Trappeur indien - documentary short, 1955 - writer, producer, director
Pour survivre en forêt - documentary short, 1955 - director
L'Alpinisme - short film, Rollo Gamble 1955 - writer
Le 22e régiment en Allemagne - documentary short, 1955 - writer, director 
Boîte de nuit - documentary short, 1955 - producer, director
Le chauffard - documentary short, 1955 - director
Circulation à Montréal - documentary short, 1955 - writer, director
L'élevage dans l'Ouest - short film, Rollo Gamble 1955 - writer
La crèche d'Youville - documentary short, 1955 - producer, director
New Hearts for Old - documentary short, 1955 - co-director with Jean Lenauer
Le Colon - documentary short, 1955 - producer, director
Les canadiens français dans l'Ouest - documentary short, 1955 - director
Nos aviateurs outre-mer - documentary short, 1955 - director 
Quartier chinois - documentary short, 1955 - director
Radio Police - documentary short, 1955 - director
Regards sur le Canada Numbers 1-13 - documentary shorts, 1955 - co-director with Robert Anderson  
Retour à Dieppe - documentary short, 1955 - producer, director
The Suspects - short film, 1956 - director
Aéro-Club - documentary short, 1956 - director
Raw Material - documentary short, 1956 - director
Alfred J. - documentary, 1956 - director
Case of Conscience - short film, 1956 - director
D'homme à homme - short film, 1956 - director
Il s'enfla si bien - short film, 1956 - director
Le cas Labrecque - short film, 1956 - director
Le vieux bien - short film, 1956 - director
Night Children - documentary short, 1956 - director
L'Homme à l'âge de la machine - short film, Donald Peters 1956 - producer
Que Dieu vous soit en aide - short film, 1956 - director
The Visit - short film, 1956 - director 
Tu enfanteras dans la joie - short film, 1956 - director
Les nouveaux venus - short film, 1957 - director
Les Brûlés, 1-8 - short films, 1957 - writer, director (released as The Promised Land in 1962)
Rendezvous - documentary short, 1958 - director 
Age of Dissent: Young Men with Opinions - documentary, 1959 - director, co-producer with Ian MacNeill
Britain and Canada Debate Britain's World Leadership - documentary, 1959 - co-producer with Ian MacNeill, co-director with Richard Gilbert 
L'immigré - short film, 1959 - director
L'Héritage - short film, 1960 - director, co-writer with Léonard Forest
Walk Down Any Street - short film, 1960 - writer, director 
Dubois et fils - short film, 1961 - co-director with Raymond Leboursier
Alexis Ladoceur, Métis - documentary short, Raymond Garceau 1961 - co-producer with Victor Jobin
The Niger, Young Republic - documentary, Claude Jutra 1961 - producer
The Promised Land - feature, 1962 - writer, director 
Les Bacheliers de la cinquième - documentary short, Clément Perron and François Séguillon 1962 - co-producer with Victor Jobin
The Gold Seekers - documentary short, Robert Russell 1962 - co-producer with Victor Jobin
The Lake Man - documentary short, Raymond Garceau 1962 - co-producer with Victor Jobin
Loisirs - documentary short, Clément Perron and Pierre Patry 1962 - co-producer with Victor Jobin
Adultes avec réserve (Boulevard Saint-Laurent) - documentary short, Jack Zolov and Marc Beaudet 1962 - co-producer with Victor Jobin
September Five at Saint-Henri - documentary short, Hubert Aquin 1962 - cinematographer
Louis-Hippolyte Lafontaine - short film, Pierre Patry 1962 - producer 
David Thompson: The Great Mapmaker - short film, 1964 - director
The Voyageurs - documentary short 1964 - producer, director 
The Correctional Process - documentary, 1964 - writer, director 
Blindness - short film, Morten Parker 1964 - co-writer with Edmund Reid and Wilson Southam
The Visit - documentary short, John Kemeny 1964 - producer 
Octopus Hunt - documentary short, 1965 - director 
Once Upon a Prime Time - short film, 1966 - director 
Pre-Release - documentary short, 1966 - writer, director 
A Question of Identity: War of 1812 - short film, 1966 - producer, director 
Judoka - documentary short, Josef Reeve 1967 - co-producer with David Bairstow
Seniority Versus Ability - documentary short, 1968 - director
A Matter of Survival - documentary short, 1969 - editor, director 
Below Zero - documentary short, Michel Régnier 1970 - co-writer with William Weintraub
The End of the Nancy J - short film, 1970 - writer, producer, director 
A Case of Eggs, Episodes 1-4 - short films, 1974 - writer, director
Striker - short film, Robert Nichol 1976 - co-producer with Israel Hicks
Nature's Food Chain - documentary short, 1977 - editor, co- producer and -director with André Petrowski

Awards

Ski Skill (1946)
 Ski Club Festival, Sestriere, Italy: First Place, Ski Club Cup, 1951
 International Sports Film Festival, Cortina d'Ampezzo, Italy: Bronze Medal, 1951

The Settler (1952)
 International Festival of the Agricultural Film, Rome: Second Prize, Education for Farmers, 1953
6th Canadian Film Awards, Montreal: Honourable Mention - Theatrical Short, 1954
 Golden Reel International Film Festival, Film Council of America, Chicago: Recognition of Merit, 1954

The Bird Fancier  (1952)
 5th Canadian Film Awards, Montreal: Best Theatrical Short, 1953

Ti-Jean Goes Lumbering (1953) 
 Yorkton Film Festival, Yorkton, Saskatchewan: Honourable Mentin, 1954
 Okanagan Film Festival, Kelowna, British Columbia: First Prize, Children’s Films, 1958

Alfred J. (1956)
 International Labour Film Festival, Vienna: Second Prize, 1957

Walk Down Any Street (1960) 
 Philippines Film Festival on Mental Health, Manila: Plaque of Merit, 1965

The Niger, Young Republic (1961)
 Festival dei Popoli, Florence, Italy: Special Jury Prize, 1961

Octopus Hunt (1965) 
 Electronic, Nuclear and Teleradio Cinematographic Review, Rome: Gold Rocket, Sports Films 1968

A Matter of Survival (1969)  
 American Film and Video Festival, New York: Blue Ribbon, 1970
 International Labour and Industrial Film Festival, Antwerp: Selection Committee Award, 1971
 International Labour and Industrial Film Festival, Antwerp: Director's Award, 1971
 International Labour and Industrial Film Festival, Antwerp: Award of Excellence, 1971
 Industrial Film Awards, New York: Best in Category: Industrial Photography, 1971

Nature's Food Chain (1977)
 American Film and Video Festival, New York: Red Ribbon, Nature and Wildlife, 1979

References

External links

Films by Bernard Devlin, National Film Board

1923 births
1983 deaths
Film directors from Quebec
National Film Board of Canada people
Canadian documentary film directors
Canadian television directors
People from Quebec City
Date of death missing
Loyola College (Montreal) alumni
Royal Navy sailors
French Quebecers